Jiří Kulich (born 14 April 2004) is a Czech professional ice hockey centre for the Rochester Americans in the American Hockey League (AHL) as a prospect to the Buffalo Sabres of the National Hockey League (NHL). He was drafted 28th overall by the Sabres in the 2022 NHL Entry Draft.

Playing career
Kulich made his professional debut for HC Energie Karlovy Vary in the Czech Extraliga during the 2020–21 season where he appeared in eight games. During the 2021–22 season he recorded nine goals and five assists in 49 games. He was drafted in the first-round, 28th overall, by the Buffalo Sabres in the 2022 NHL Entry Draft.

On 15 July 2022, Kulich embarked on his North American career after he was signed to a three-year, entry-level contract with the Sabres.

International play

Kulich represented the Czech Republic at the 2021 IIHF World U18 Championships where he appeared in four games. He again represented Czech Republic at the 2022 IIHF World U18 Championships where he served as captain. He led the tournament in goals with nine and was subsequently named tournament MVP. 

He represented the Czech Republic at the 2022 World Junior Ice Hockey Championships. He again represented the Czech Republic at the 2023 World Junior Ice Hockey Championships where he recorded seven goals and two assists in seven games and won a silver medal.

Career statistics

Regular season and playoffs

International

References

External links
 

2004 births
Living people
Buffalo Sabres draft picks
Czech ice hockey forwards
HC Karlovy Vary players
National Hockey League first-round draft picks
People from Kadaň
Rochester Americans players
Sportovní Klub Kadaň players
Sportspeople from the Ústí nad Labem Region
Czech expatriate ice hockey players in the United States